The Roman Catholic Archdiocese of Chambéry, Saint-Jean-de-Maurienne, and Tarentaise (Latin: Archidioecesis Camberiensis, Maruianensis et Tarantasiensis; French: Archidiocèse de Chambéry, Saint-Jean-de-Maurienne et Tarentaise) is an archdiocese of the Latin Church of the Roman Catholic Church in France and a suffragan of the Archdiocese of Lyon. The archepiscopal see is Chambéry Cathedral, located in the city of Chambéry. The archdiocese encompasses the department of Savoie, in the Region of Rhône-Alpes.

The diocese was created in 1779, from the Diocese of Grenoble, after a complicated earlier history. It became an archdiocese in 1817, though at that point it was not within French territory.

History

In 1467, in the ducal chapel built for the Holy Winding-Sheet (Santo Sudario, better known as the Turin Shroud) by Amadeus IX of Savoy, and the Duchess Yolande of France, Pope Paul II erected a chapter directly subject to the Holy See, and his successor Pope Sixtus IV, united this chapter with the deanery of Savoy. In 1515 Pope Leo X published a papal bull making the deanery an archbishopric, but Francis I of France objected, and it was only in 1775 that this deanery was separated from the Diocese of Grenoble by Pope Pius VI, who, in 1779, created it a bishopric with the see at Chambéry.

The Duchy of Savoy, politically subject to the King of Sardinia, had thenceforth four bishoprics: Chambéry, the diocese of Saint-Jean de Maurienne, diocese of Tarentaise, and Geneva (with residence at the diocese of Annecy). In October, 1792, the commissaries to the Convention formed the constitutional Diocese of Mont-Blanc, with Annecy as the see and Lyons as the metropolitan. The Concordat of 1802 created a Diocese of Chambéry and Geneva, suffragan of the archdiocese of Lyons.

A Bull dated 17 July 1817, made Chambéry, once more a city of the Sardinian States, the seat of an archdiocese, with the diocese of Aosta for suffragan; the Dioceses of Annecy (re-established in 1822), Saint-Jean-Maurienne, and Tarentaise (in 1825), soon also became suffragans of Chambéry. After the annexation of Savoy to France, in 1860, this condition continued, except that the Diocese of Aosta was made a suffragan of the archdiocese of Turin.

The Cistercian Abbey of Hautecombe, founded in 1135, is one of the burial places of the House of Savoy. The relic known as the Holy Winding-Sheet of Christ was kept at Chambéry until 1598, in which year the Duke of Savoy had it transported to Turin, where St. Charles Borromeo wished to venerate it. Notre-Dame de Myans (antedating the twelfth century), where St. Francis de Sales officiated, and Notre-Dame de l'Aumone at Rumilly (thirteenth century), whither Francis I of France went as a pilgrim, are still places of pilgrimage. The Sisters of St. Joseph, an order devoted to teaching and charitable work, were founded at Chambéry in 1812.

On 16 December 2002 the Archdiocese of Chambéry became a suffragan of the Archdiocese of Lyon and ceased to be a Metropolitan.

Bishop
 1780–1793 Michel Conseil

Archbishops
 1802–1805, René des Monstiers (or de Moustier) de Mérinville, also Bishop of Dijon
 1805–1823, Irénée-Yves De Solle (or Desolle or Dessole), also bishop of Digne
 1824–1827, François-Marie Bigex, also bishop of Pinerolo
 1828–1839, Antoine Martinet, also bishop of Tarentaise
 1840–1873, Cardinal Alexis Billiet, also bishop of Saint-Jean-de-Maurienne
 1873–1880, Pierre-Athanase Pichenot, also bishop of Tarbes
 1881–1893, François-Albert Leuillieux, also bishop of Carcassonne
 1803–1907, François Hautin, also bishop of Évreux
 April–August, 1907, Gustave-Adolphe de Pélacot, also bishop of Troyes
 1907–1914, Cardinal François-Virgile Dubillard, also bishop of Quimper-Cornouailles
 1915–1936, Dominique Castellan, also bishop of Digne
 1937–1947, Pierre-Marie Durieux, also bishop of Viviers
 1947–1966  Louis-Marie-Fernand de Bazelaire de Ruppierre
 1966–1985, André Bontemps, also bishop of Saint-Jean-de-Maurienne
 1985–2000, Claude Feidt, also archbishop of Aix
 2000–2008, Laurent Ulrich, also archbishop of Lille
 2009–2022, Philippe Ballot

See also
Catholic Church in France

References

Bibliography

Reference works
  (Use with caution; obsolete)
  (in Latin) 
 (in Latin)

Studies

External links
Source

Chambery
Chambéry
1779 establishments in France